The 1849 Michigan gubernatorial election was held on November 6, 1849. Democratic nominee John S. Barry defeated Whig nominee Flavius J. Littlejohn with 54.22% of the vote.

General election

Candidates
Major party candidates
John S. Barry, Democratic
Flavius J. Littlejohn, Whig

Results

References

1849
Michigan
Gubernatorial
November 1849 events